UTS Balmain Tigers Water Polo Club is an Australian club water polo team that competes in the National Water Polo League.  They have a men's team and a women's team and are based in Balmain, New South Wales.

The club have been sponsored by the University of Technology Sydney since 2009.

References

External links
 

Water polo clubs in Australia
Sporting clubs in Sydney
Sports clubs established in 1884
1884 establishments in Australia
Balmain, New South Wales